Gavimata is a sacred place with temples of Shiva in Chaluvanahalli, Banavara Hobli, Arasikere Taluk, Hassan District, Karnataka, India. It has a hill view and many devotees from all over Arasikere visit here.

There is a "Samadhi" of the Saint/ Sharana Sidmallappa. It is said that Sidmallappa buried himself alive (Jeevantha Aikya in Kannada) here in the 19th century in offering to Lord Shiva.

This place has a school which is run by the Trust of Gavimata. It also has a dark and mysterious cave called "Kallara Gavi" meaning Robber's cave.

Hindu temples in Hassan district